The year 1892 in archaeology involved some significant events.

Explorations
 August - Survey of Coldrum Long Barrow in south east England.

Excavations
 Excavations to uncover the fortifications of Thebes, Greece, are begun by lawyer Eustratios Kalopais.

Finds
 Glastonbury Lake Village discovered by Arthur Bulleid in the Somerset Levels of England.
 Gough's Cave discovered in Cheddar Gorge (Somerset), England.
 "Venus of Brassempouy" discovered in France.

Publications

Miscellaneous
 The American School of Classical Studies at Athens is founded.
 Sir William Ridgeway is elected to the Disney Professorship of Archaeology in the University of Cambridge.

Births
April 14 - V. Gordon Childe, Australian-born prehistorian (died 1957).
May 5 - Dorothy Garrod, English Palaeolithic archaeologist of the Near East (died 1968).

Deaths
April 15 - Amelia Edwards, English Egyptologist and fiction writer (born 1831)

References

Archaeology, 1892 In
Archaeology by year
1890s in science
Archaeology, 1892 In